Sahebeh Rouhani (née Arabi) is the wife of former Iranian President Hassan Rouhani. 
A first cousin of Hassan Rouhani, their marriage was arranged by their parents when she was 14 and he was 20 years old.

Family 
Rouhani is the daughter of Abdolazim Arabi and Sareh-Khaton Peyvandi, aunt of Hassan Rouhani. She is married to Hassan Rouhani, her cousin, in 1968. They have 5 children, the eldest of whom died in 1992.  She does not participate in politics and spends her time engaged in charitable affairs. In July 2014, she started the construction of ten kindergartens.

See also
Cousin marriage in the Middle East

References

1954 births
Living people
People from Semnan, Iran
Hassan Rouhani
Wives of presidents of Iran
People from Sorkheh, Semnan, Iran